The Dark Man may refer to:

 The Dark Man (film), directed by Jeffrey Dell (1951)
 The Dark Man (poem), by Stephen King
 Randall Flagg, a fictional character in several Stephen King works

See also 
 Dark Man (disambiguation)